Eugène Chavant was the founder of the French resistance organisation France Combat in 1942 and a prominent member of the French resistance. His nom de guerre was Clement, hence the "dit Clement" on the memorial to him in Grenoble. He was a member of the CDLN (Departmental Committee for National Liberation) for the département of Isère during the war. He was also a decorated war hero of the First World War.

Early life
Eugène Chavant was born on 12 February 1894 in Colombe, Isère, the son of a shoe-maker.
He studied at the village school before becoming a mechanic in a factory, during which time he followed the distance-learning programme of the Ecole du Génie Civil which allowed him to become a master tradesman.

World War 1
In 1914, he was mobilised in the 11th Dragoons, then transferred to the 20th Battalion of Chasseurs where he was made a sergeant and platoon leader. Gassed near Soissons in 1918, he refused to leave the front. His attitude led him to receive the Médaille Militaire and the Croix de Guerre with four citations.

Present-day
In Grenoble, he is commemorated by the tram-stop (lines A and C) Chavant.

Honours
 Commandeur de la Légion d'Honneur
 Compagnon de la Libération
 Commandeur de l'Ordre National du Mérite
 Médaille Militaire
 Croix de Guerre 1914-1918 (4 citations)
 Croix de Guerre 1939-1945
 Médaille de la Résistance

References
  Entry on ordredelaliberation.fr
 The majority of this article was translated from the French source text there.

French Resistance members
French military personnel of World War I
Companions of the Liberation
People from Colombes
Recipients of the Croix de Guerre (France)
Recipients of the Resistance Medal